Norman Eugene Olsen (December 1, 1914 – October 1977) was an American football tackle who played one season with the Cleveland Rams. He played college football at the University of Alabama. He died in October 1977 at the age of 62.

References

1914 births
1977 deaths
Alabama Crimson Tide football players
American football tackles
Cleveland Rams players
Players of American football from New York City